Pokeshaw is an unincorporated village in Gloucester County (New Bandon Parish), New Brunswick, Canada. It houses a former provincial, now communal park that includes a beach, and a large rock island, Pokeshaw Island, also known as Bird Island, because of the many birds frequently seen on the top of the large rock.

There are three main industries in Pokeshaw: fishing, farming and maple products. There are two farms in the area: Whelton's beef farm, near the Pokeshaw/Grand Anse border, and Riordon Farms, a dairy farm, as well as a maple sugar camp, Riordon Maple Products.

Pokeshaw and its surrounding areas are fertile with moose, deer and rabbit as well as abundant fish stocks.  Fresh water springs and dense forests make for attractive outdoors activities such as hiking, fishing and hunting. The nearest village is Grande Anse and the larger towns are Bathurst and Caraquet.

History

Pokeshaw was settled by the Sisk family in the early 1800s and remained until the 1960s. The Sisks were in large a farming and fishing family and had 13 offspring whose own descendants have spread across Canada and into the US.

Notable people

See also
List of communities in New Brunswick

References

Communities in Gloucester County, New Brunswick